William Song is an engineer at the MIT Lincoln Laboratory in Lexington, Massachusetts. He was named a Fellow of the Institute of Electrical and Electronics Engineers (IEEE) in 2015 for his contributions to high-performance low-power embedded processors.

References

Fellow Members of the IEEE
Living people
MIT Lincoln Laboratory people
Year of birth missing (living people)
Place of birth missing (living people)